Multiple coagulation factor deficiency protein 2 is a protein that in humans is encoded by the MCFD2 gene. Mutations in MCFD2 cause the combined deficiency of factor V and factor VIII (F5F8D), a recessive bleeding disorder. MCFD2 and ERGIC-53 (or LMAN1) form a protein complex and serve as a cargo receptor to transport FV and FVIII from the ER to the Golgi body. Mutations in LMAN1 gene (encoding ERGIC-53 or LMAN1) also cause F5F8D.

References

Further reading